Les Coulisses du pouvoir ("The Corridors of Power") is a Canadian television news series, which airs on Ici Radio-Canada Télé and Ici RDI. Hosted by Daniel Thibeault, the series covers Canadian politics in a Sunday morning talk show format, including both interviews with political figures and panel discussions.

Regular panelists on the series include journalists Alec Castonguay, Michel C. Auger and Chantal Hébert.

The program was previously hosted by Daniel Lessard prior to 2011, and by Emmanuelle Latraverse from 2011 to 2017.

References

Canadian Sunday morning talk shows
Ici Radio-Canada Télé original programming
Television shows filmed in Ottawa
2000s Canadian television talk shows
2010s Canadian television talk shows
2020s Canadian television talk shows
2000s Canadian television news shows
2010s Canadian television news shows
2020s Canadian television news shows